Friday Night Funkin' (stylized as FRIDAY NIGHT FUNKIN' and often abbreviated to FNF) is an open-source donationware rhythm game first released in 2020 for a game jam. The game was developed by a team of four Newgrounds users, Cameron "ninjamuffin99" Taylor, David "PhantomArcade" Brown, Isaac "Kawai Sprite" Garcia, and evilsk8r. The game shares some gameplay features with Dance Dance Revolution and PaRappa the Rapper and borrows aesthetic influences from Flash games. The game has been credited with driving users back to Newgrounds, a site whose popularity peaked in the early 2000s.

The game mainly revolves around the player character, Boyfriend, who must defeat a variety of characters in singing and rapping contests in order to continue dating his love interest, Girlfriend. Gameplay revolves around hitting notes with timed inputs while avoiding running out of health for the duration of the song.

The game was initially created for the Ludum Dare 47 game jam in October 2020. A full version backed on Kickstarter titled Friday Night Funkin': The Full Ass Game is currently in development.

Gameplay

Friday Night Funkin''' is a rhythm game in which the player controls a character called Boyfriend, who must defeat a series of opponents in order to continue dating his significant other, Girlfriend. The player must pass multiple levels, referred to as "weeks" in-game, containing three songs each. Each week, the player faces a different opponent, though some deviate in structure from this via the inclusion of multiple opponents. During gameplay, the opponent will sing a pattern of notes (represented as arrows) which the player must then mirror by using the arrow keys or the W, A, S, and D keys. Some songs introduce more complicated patterns, with the player's pattern sometimes varying from the opponent's or both singers engaging in a duet.

For each week, the player has the option to select one of three difficulties: Easy, Normal, or Hard. As the difficulty increases, the speed of incoming arrows increases, and the patterns of arrows become more complex. The player's high score for each week on each difficulty is tracked and shown in the top corner of the week selection screen. The game contains two different modes of play: a story campaign in which songs are played linearly and a "free play" mode which allows for free selection of any of the game's music tracks.

History
Development

Ninjamuffin99 assembled a small team of Newgrounds creators to develop an initial Friday Night Funkin' prototype as a submission to Ludum Dare 47 in October 2020, which contained only a handful of music tracks and lacked menus. Despite its rudimentary design, the prototype received unexpected success, leading to many requests for a full game. In response, ninjamuffin99 stated that he had plans to expand the game.

Ninjamuffin99 would later update this demo on November 1, 2020, which added several additional menus and options as well as Week 2, an additional fight. Interest in the game increased, with it quickly growing in notoriety on Newgrounds as it had received significant attention via platforms such as YouTube, Twitter, TikTok, and Twitch. Its soundtrack by composer Kawai Sprite has been made available for free on Bandcamp and Spotify.

In February 2021, ninjamuffin99 asked Nintendo to allow his game to be ported to the Nintendo Switch. However, his request was rejected, which he believed was because the game was incomplete.

Week 7 was released as a timed exclusive on Newgrounds. Due to the increase in traffic this caused to Newgrounds, the site crashed. The game ended its weekly update following Week 7, with the developers instead focusing on working on the full game, titled Friday Night Funkin': The Full Ass Game.

Kickstarter
In April 2021, the developers announced plans to launch a Kickstarter project later in the month to turn the demo into a full game. On April 18, a Kickstarter project for the full version of the game was released under the name Friday Night Funkin': The Full Ass Game and reached its goal of $60,000 within hours. The Kickstarter ultimately raised over $2 million. In February 2022, IGN reported that Friday Night Funkin': The Full Ass Game'' was one of the most funded Kickstarter projects of 2021. The full game will include a mobile version for Android and iOS, an "Erect" mode which remixes the songs to make them harder, online multiplayer, and multiple new levels. The game will cost $10 to $20 USD but may be free and open-source on GitHub.

Modding
The game has an extremely active modding community due to its open-source release, allowing for the implementation of fan-made content. As a result, the full game will receive mod support using the Polymod framework.

References

External links
 
 ''Friday Night Funkin''' on Itch.io
 
 ''Friday Night Funkin''' (Newgrounds Demo) on Newgrounds
 ''Friday Night Funkin''' (Ludum Dare Prototype) on Itch.io
 Funkin' Crew's Blog

2020 video games
Indie video games
Rhythm games
Video games developed in Canada
Browser games
Windows games
MacOS games
Linux games
Open-source video games
Single-player video games
Kickstarter-funded video games
Video games about demons
Video game memes